Fern Aline Waller (née Eggen, 7 November 1919 – 2 February 1996), known as Aline Towne, was an American film and television actress, best remembered for her lead roles in 1950s Republic serials, such as Radar Men from the Moon.

Biography
Towne was born in Saint Paul, Minnesota.

Towne appeared in dozens of roles on television, in series such as Lassie, Leave It to Beaver,  Sea Hunt, Wagon Train, Maverick, The Lone Ranger, and The Donna Reed Show. In 1952 she played Lara, Superman's mother in the first episode of the Adventures of Superman.  She also had a small speaking role (billed as Fern Eggen) in White Heat (1949).

She died in Burbank, California in 1996.

Filmography

References

External links
 
 Aline Towne at Rotten Tomatoes

1919 births
1996 deaths
Actresses from Saint Paul, Minnesota
American television actresses
American film actresses
Film serial actresses
20th-century American actresses